Dhing Shah, a village in Kasur District of the Pakistani province of Punjab.

The village is served by a gas pipe line provided by the Punjab government, and also supplies of water, cable TV and the Internet. Dhing Shah has a Government Boys High School and Girls Middle School.

References

Populated places in Kasur District